Ian Bartholomew (born 23 August 1954) is a British actor and musician from Portsmouth, England who has worked widely in both theatre and television. In March 2018, Bartholomew joined the cast of ITV soap opera, Coronation Street, as Geoff Metcalfe. He also played Chitterlow in the revival cast of Half A Sixpence alongside Charlie Stemp, who played Arthur Kipps, and the Baker in the original West End production of Into the Woods opposite Imelda Staunton as his wife.

Career
Bartholomew was born in Portsmouth, Hampshire, and brought up in Gosport. In television Bartholomew's work has ranged from The Darling Buds of May, Rumpole of the Bailey, Minder, and more recently, Making Waves, Spooks and Marcella.

On stage he has been in productions such as A Man for All Seasons at the Redgrave Theatre in Farnham, Mirandolina and Assassins. In 2005 he was in the acclaimed production of Who's Afraid of Virginia Woolf by Edward Albee in the starring role of George at the Liverpool Playhouse and in that same year also at the playhouse he appeared in Alan Ayckbourn's Christmas comedy Season's Greetings. At the Menier Chocolate Factory in London he appeared in the new musical Take Flight in 2007. In 2010 he was well received as Eliza Doolittle's father in the Royal Exchange's production of Pygmalion. In 2011 in Mogadishu by Vivienne Franzmann at the Royal Exchange in Manchester and then at the Lyric Theatre in London.

In 2017 he recorded two songs for the album Wit & Whimsy - Songs by Alexander S. Bermange (one solo and one featuring all of the album's 23 artists), which reached No. 1 in the iTunes comedy album chart.

Bartholomew joined the cast of Coronation Street  as Geoff Metcalfe in March 2018.

Personal life
Bartholomew is married to theatre director Loveday Ingram. Their first child was born in March 2005 and their youngest was born in December 2007.

Filmography

Theatre

His work in the theatre includes: -

 Truffaldino, The Servant of Two Masters by Carlo Goldoni. Directed by Martin Duncan at the Richmond Theatre (1982)
 Deemer,Winding the Ball by Alex Finlayson. World premiere directed by Greg Hersov at the Royal Exchange, Manchester (1989)
 Joseph Surface,The School for Scandal by Richard Brinsley Sheridan. Directed by Phyllida Lloyd at the Royal Exchange, Manchester (1990)
 Oliver,Doctor Heart by Peter Muller. British premiere directed by Braham Murray at the Royal Exchange, Manchester (1991)
 The Fool, King Lear. Directed by Greg Hersov at the Royal Exchange, Manchester (1999)
 George, Who's Afraid of Virginia Woolf by Edward Albee at the Liverpool Playhouse (2005)
 Charles Guiteau, Assassins by Stephen Sondheim. Directed by Nicolai Forster at the Crucible Theatre, Sheffield (2006)
 Count Albafiorita,Mirandolina by Goldoni. Directed by Jonathon Munby at the Royal Exchange, Manchester (2006)
 George Putnam, Take Flight by David Shire and Richard Maltby. Directed by Sam Buntrock at the Menier Chocolate Factory (2007) 
 Lickcheese, Widowers' Houses by George Bernard Shaw. Directed by Greg Hersov at the Royal Exchange, Manchester (2009)
 Horace Vandergelder, Hello Dolly. Directed by Timothy Sheader at the Open Air Theatre, Regent's Park(2009)
 Paul Hammond, The Power of Yes by David Hare. Directed by Angus Jackson at the Royal National Theatre (2009)
 Alfred Doolttle, Pygmalion by George Bernard Shaw. Directed by Greg Hersov at the Royal Exchange, Manchester (2010)
 Chris, Mogadishu by Vivienne Franzmann. World premiere directed by Matthew Dunster at the Royal Exchange, Manchester (2011)
 Touchstone,As You Like It. Directed by Greg Hersov at the Royal Exchange, Manchester (2011)
 Arturo Ui,The Resistible Rise of Arturo Ui. Directed by Walter Meierjohann at the Nottingham Playhouse (2011)

References

External links
 

1954 births
Living people
English male stage actors
English male soap opera actors
Male actors from Portsmouth
People from Gosport
20th-century English male actors
21st-century English male actors